Ballygowan Halt railway station was on the Banbridge, Lisburn and Belfast Railway, which ran from Knockmore Junction to Banbridge in Northern Ireland. The station served County Down.

History

The station was opened by the Great Northern Railway (Ireland) on 10 September 1929 and closed on 30 April 1956.

It had a single cinder platform, with an old railway carriage used as a waiting room.

References 

Disused railway stations in County Down
Railway stations opened in 1929
Railway stations closed in 1956
1929 establishments in Northern Ireland
1956 disestablishments in Northern Ireland
Railway stations in Northern Ireland opened in the 20th century